The consorts of Finland were the spouses of the Finnish Monarchs. They used the titles Grand Duchess of Finland, briefly Queen of the Finns, and later Queen consort of Finland:

Duchess of Finland

Grand Duchess of Finland

House of Vasa

House of Palatinate-Zweibrücken 

Title fell into disuse

House of Holstein-Gottorp-Romanov

Kingdom of Finland

Queen consort-Elect

House of Hesse-Kassel

Possible/Titular Queen consort

House of Hesse-Kassel

See also 
 List of Swedish consorts
 List of Russian consorts

Notes

Finnish royalty
Finland
Finland
Finnish monarchy
Finland
Consorts